Moshorin plateau (Serbian Cyrillic: Мошоринска Висораван) or Moshorin plateau is a loess plateau situated in the Vojvodina province, Serbia. It is located in south-eastern Bačka (Šajkaška region), between the town of Titelberg in the south, the villages of Glock, Vilovo and Šajkaš in the south-west, the village of Mošorin in the north, and the river Tisa in the east. It is 18 km long and 7.5 km wide, with steep cliffs, up to 60 m high along the Tisa. The hill has a flat top with an elevation of around 100 to maximally 128 m. The cliffs and the flat top give it a mesa-like appearance. The hill is an interesting geographical feature because it is the only hill in Bačka region, most of which is a flat plain. It is a loess formation deposited during the Pleistocene,  showing six distinct bands, visible in gullies at the edge.'''

See also
Šajkaška
Bačka
Mošorinska Visoravan

References

External links
Image of Titelski Breg
Geography of Vojvodina

Hills of Serbia
Bačka
Geography of Vojvodina
Nature reserves in Serbia
Pleistocene geology
Pleistocene Europe